Major General Kaidar Samigullovich Karakulov is a Kazakh general. He is currently the commander the Regional Command "South" of the Kazakh Ground Forces.

He was born 9 June 1974 in the Buguruslansky District of the Orenburg Oblast in the RSFSR. In 1991, he joined the Armed Forces of the Republic of Kazakhstan. He graduated from the Alma-Ata Higher All-Arms Command School. Ten years later, he graduated from the National Defense University. In 2012, he graduated from the Military Academy of the General Staff of the Armed Forces of Russia. Between his educational studies, he served as a tank platoon commander, a commander of a motorized rifle company, deputy brigade commander, and chief of staff in the office of a commander of forces. In 2010, he led the Kazakh contingent form the Honor Guard Company of the Ministry of Defense during the 2010 Moscow Victory Day Parade. By the decree of President Nursultan Nazarbayev on the occasion of the 25th anniversary of the Kazakh military, he was awarded the rank of Major General. In November 2016, he was appointed commander of units in the capital Astana. On 18 April 2018, he was relieved of his post as commander of the Astana Regional Command and was appointed commander of the Airborne Assault Forces of the Ground Forces. On 4 May 2019, he was appointed commander of the Southern Regional Command.

He is married to Roza Rakimzhanovna Karakulova, with whom he has 3 children.

References 

Living people
Kazakhstani generals
Military Academy of the General Staff of the Armed Forces of the Soviet Union alumni
1974 births
People from Buguruslansky District